The official translation Duke of Victoria, or literal translation Duke of the Victory, is a title created by the governments of several countries:

Duque da Vitória, a Portuguese title of nobility, created in 1812 for the British general Arthur Wellesley
Duke of Victoria de las Amezcoas, a Spanish title of nobility, created in 1836 for the Spanish Carlist general Tomás de Zumalacárregui
Duke of la Victoria, a Spanish title of nobility, created in 1839 for the Spanish general Baldomero Espartero
Duca della Vittoria, an Italian title of nobility, created in 1921 for the Italian general Armando Diaz

es:Duque de la Victoria